Northern Limit Line is a 2015 South Korean naval thriller film written and directed by Kim Hak-soon, based on the real-life events of the Second Battle of Yeonpyeong. It stars Kim Mu-yeol, Jin Goo, and Lee Hyun-woo.

Plot
Corporal Park Dong-hyuk is a newly enlisted sailor in the Republic of Korea Navy assigned to the patrol vessel PKM 357. In the midst of the 2002 FIFA World Cup taking place in South Korea, North Korea deploys fishing trawlers with spies to cross the Northern Limit Line (the demarcation line at sea). PKM 357  seizes the trawlers and their men, which allows the spies to familiarise themselves with the ship's superstructure. The North Koreans are eventually released upon orders by the South Korean high command, as part of the government's Sunshine Policy.

Over the coming month, North Korea's Korean People's Navy repeatedly enters South Korean waters to reconnoitre and survey the ROK Navy's patrolling tactics and defensive measures. The South Korean Ministry of Defense is notified about North's strategy but is again ordered by the Blue House to not engage first. South Korea also receives intelligence reports that an attack is forthcoming, but does not change the rules of engagement to counter the looming threat despite the repeated requests of PKM 357'''s commander, Lieutenant Commander Yoon Young-ha.

On 29 June 2002, the second Battle of Yeonpyeong commences with a surprise attack on PKM 357 by a North Korean patrol vessel. The ensuing battle severely cripples both ships before reinforcements from the South arrives and forces the North's patrol vessel to retreat. 19 wounded and 4 deaths are confirmed before PKM 357 sinks due to uncontrollable fires. Naval divers eventually find the helmsman's body in the sunken vessel.

83 days later, Park Dong-hyuk succumbs to his wounds, becoming the final casualty of the battle. The movie ends with the real life surviving crew members reminiscing about their colleagues with photos of those who perished.

 Cast 
 Kim Mu-yeol as Lieutenant Commander Yoon Young-ha
 Jin Goo as Sergeant Han Sang-gook
 Lee Hyun-woo as Corporal Park Dong-hyuk
 Lee Wan as Lieutenant Lee Hee-wan
 Kim Ji-hoon  as Jo Chun-hyung
 Jang Joon-hak as Hwang Do-hyun 
 Joo Hee-joong as Seo Hoo-won
 Kim Dong-hee as Corporal Kwon Gi-hyung
 Kim Ha-kyun as Boatswain
 Han Seong-yong as Sergeant Lee 
 Kim Dong-beom as Kim Il-byung 
 Lee Cheol-min as Unit 232 general
 Park Jeong-hak as Lee Dae-joon
 Cheon Min-hee as Kim Ji-sun
 Kwon Hwa-woon as Corporal Kim Seung-hyun 
 Park Hyo-jun
 Jang Eui-soo as Kim Myoen-soo
 Lee Chung-ah as Captain Choi Yoon-jung (cameo)
 Song Jae-ho as Yoon Doo-ho (cameo)
 Sunwoo Jae-duk as young Yoon Doo-ho (cameo)
 Kim Hee-jung as Park Dong-hyuk's mother (cameo)
 Choi Jong-hwan as North Korean high-ranking official (cameo)
 Jung Joo-ri as Visiting girl (cameo)

 Production 
Director Kim Hak-soon shot the film in 3D, having received a grant from the Korean Film Council (3D effects were done by Dnext Media). Kim said, "I believe that 3D visuals would enable viewers to feel the pain and fear felt by the (men) in a more effective and immersive way."

After initial investors backed out, it took the film seven years to finish production. A third of the budget was raised through crowdfunding via donations by 7,000 individuals. They include 23 members of the 2002 South Korean national football team, and Chung Mong-joon, owner of Hyundai Heavy Industries Group and former president of the Korea Football Association, who donated .

 Release Northern Limit Line was originally set to premiere on June 11, 2015, but due to concerns over the MERS outbreak, distributor Next Entertainment World delayed the theatrical release by two weeks to June 24.

 Box office 
The film topped the box office on its opening day, and by its first four days of release it had recorded 1.43 million admissions, grossing ; this was notable since June is considered a slow season for the Korean film industry.

As of August 2, it has sold 6,024,894 tickets (grossing ), making it the most-watched Korean film in 2015.

 Political reception 
While North Korean state media outlet Uriminzokkiri'' lambasted it, calling it "distorted" and an "anti-DPRK movie," South Korean conservative politicians such as former president Lee Myung-bak recommended the film.

Awards and nominations

References

External links 
  
  
  
  
 
 
 

2015 films
2015 war drama films
2015 3D films
2010s Korean-language films
South Korean 3D films
South Korean war drama films
War films based on actual events
Films set in North Korea
Films set in Pyongyang
Films set in 2002
Films about naval warfare
Films about the Republic of Korea Navy
Next Entertainment World films
South Korean films based on actual events
2010s South Korean films